Edmund Campion, SJ (25 January 15401 December 1581) was an English Jesuit priest and martyr. While conducting an underground ministry in officially Anglican England, Campion was arrested by priest hunters. Convicted of high treason, he was hanged, drawn and quartered at Tyburn. Campion was beatified by Pope Leo XIII in 1886 and canonised in 1970 by Pope Paul VI as one of the Forty Martyrs of England and Wales. His feast day is celebrated on 1 December.

Early years and education (1540–1569)
Born in London on 25 January 1540, Campion was the son of a bookseller in Paternoster Row, near St Paul's Cathedral. He received his early education at Christ's Hospital school and, at the age of 13, was chosen to make the complimentary speech when Queen Mary visited the city in August 1553. William Chester, a governor of Christ's Hospital, took a special interest in him, and sponsored him as a scholar to St John's College, Oxford, where he became junior fellow in 1557 and took the required Oath of Supremacy, probably on the occasion of his B.A. degree in 1560. He took a master's degree at Oxford in 1564.

Two years later, Campion welcomed Queen Elizabeth to the university, and won her lasting regard. He was selected to lead a public debate in front of the Queen. By the time the Queen had left Oxford, Campion had earned the patronage of the powerful William Cecil and also the Earl of Leicester, tipped by some to be future husband of the young Queen.

When Sir Thomas White, the founder of the college, was buried in 1567, it fell to Campion to give the Latin oration.

Rejecting Anglicanism
Religious difficulties then arose but despite holding Catholic doctrines, at the persuasion of Richard Cheyney, Bishop of Gloucester, he received Holy Orders in 1564 as a deacon in the Anglican Church. Inwardly "he took a remorse of conscience and detestation of mind." Rumours of his opinions began to spread and he left Oxford in 1569 and went to Ireland for private study and research, but not, as Simpson said (now corrected by P. Joseph's revision of Simpson, 2010) to take part in a proposed establishment of the University of Dublin.

Ireland (1569–1570)
Campion went to Ireland with his university friend, Richard Stanihurst, where he was the guest of Richard and his father, James Stanihurst, the Speaker of the Irish House of Commons. Warned of his imminent arrest by the Lord Deputy Sir Henry Sidney, he was transferred through Stanihurst's arrangement to the house of Christopher Barnewall at Turvey House in the Pale. For some three months he eluded his pursuers, going by the name "Mr Patrick" and occupying himself by writing A Historie of Ireland.

Douai (1571–1573)
In the year of 1571, Campion left Ireland in secret and escaped to Douai in the Low Countries (now France) where he was reconciled to the Catholic Church and received the Eucharist that he had denied himself for the past twelve years. He entered the English College founded by William Allen. The enrollment of the college grew, and a papal subsidy was granted a little time after Campion's arrival. Campion found himself reunited with Oxford friends. He was to teach rhetoric while there and finish studying for the degree of Bachelor of Divinity, which was granted him by the University of Douai on 21 January 1573. He received minor orders after this and was ordained sub-deacon.

Rome, Brünn and Prague (1573–1580)
Campion then travelled to Rome on foot, alone and in the guise of a pilgrim, to join the Jesuits. In April 1573, in Rome, he became the first novice accepted into the Society of Jesus by Mercurianus, the order's fourth Superior General. He was assigned to the Austrian Province as there was not yet an English province of the Jesuits and began his two-year novitiate at Brünn (now Brno) in Moravia. He was ordained deacon and priest by Anthony Brus, OMCRS, Archbishop of Prague and said his first Mass on 8 September 1578. For six years, Campion taught at the Jesuit college in Prague as professor of both rhetoric and philosophy. In 1578 his play Ambrosia was staged in Prague by the students of the recently founded Jesuit College Clementinum.

Mission to England (1580–1581)
In 1580, the Jesuit mission to England began. The mission was strictly forbidden, according to Campion's Challenge to the Privy Council, "to deal in any respects with matters of state or policy of this [English] realm..." Campion accompanied Robert Persons who, as superior, was intended to counterbalance his own fervour and impetuousness. He had been surprised to learn that he was chosen to take part in the mission, and expressed the fear that he lacked constitutional courage. The members of the mission were instructed to avoid the company of boys and women and to avoid giving the impression of being legacy hunters. Before embarking, the members of the mission were embarrassed to receive news of a landing by papal-sponsored forces in the Irish province of Munster in support of the Irish rebel James Fitzmaurice Fitzgerald. They also learned that a letter detailing their party and mission had been intercepted and that they were expected in England.
 Campion finally entered England in the guise of a jewel merchant, arriving in London on 24 June 1580, and at once began to preach. His presence soon became known to the authorities and to his fellow Catholics lying in London's prisons. Among the latter was Thomas Pounde in the Marshalsea, where a meeting was held to discuss means of counteracting rumours circulated by the Privy Council to the effect that Campion's mission was political and treasonous. Pounde rode in haste after Campion and explained the need for Campion to write a brief declaration of the true causes of his coming. The diffusion of this declaration, known as the Challenge to the Privy Council, or, Campion's Brag, made his position more difficult. He led a hunted life, administering the sacraments and preaching to Catholics in Berkshire, Oxfordshire, Northamptonshire, and Lancashire.

During this time he wrote his Decem Rationes ("Ten Reasons"), arguments against the validity of the Anglican Church. This pamphlet, in Latin, was printed in a clandestine press at Stonor Park, Henley, and 400 copies were found on the benches of St Mary's, Oxford, at the Commencement, on 27 June 1581. It caused great sensation, and the hunt for Campion was stepped up. On his way to Norfolk, he stopped at Lyford Grange, the house of Francis Yate, then in Berkshire, where he preached on 14 July and the following day, by popular request. Here, he was captured by a spy named George Eliot and taken to London with his arms pinioned and bearing on his hat a paper with the inscription "Campion, the Seditious Jesuit".

Imprisonment, torture and disputations
Imprisoned for four days in the Tower of London in a tiny cell called "Little Ease", Campion was then taken out and questioned by three Privy Councillors—Lord Chancellor Sir Thomas Bromley, Vice-Chamberlain of the Royal Household Sir Christopher Hatton and Robert Dudley, Earl of Leicester—on matters including whether he acknowledged Queen Elizabeth to be the true Queen of England. He replied that he did, and was offered his freedom, wealth and honours, including a possibility of the Archbishopric of Canterbury, which he could not accept in good conscience.

Campion was imprisoned in the Tower more than four months and tortured on the rack two or three times. False reports of a retraction and of a confession by Campion were circulated. He had four public disputations with his Anglican adversaries, on 1, 18, 23 and 27 September 1581, at which they attempted to address the challenges of Campion's Challenge to the Privy Council and Decem Rationes. Although still suffering from the effects of his torture, and allowed neither time nor books for preparation, he reportedly conducted himself so easily and readily that "even the spectators in the court looked for an acquittal".

He was arraigned and indicted on 14 November 1581 with several others at Westminster on a charge of having conspired, in Rome and Reims, to raise a sedition in the realm and dethrone the Queen.

Trial, sentence and execution
The trial was held on 20 November 1581. After hearing the pleadings for three hours, the jury deliberated an hour before delivering its verdict: Campion and his fellow defendants were found guilty of treason. He answered the verdict: 

Lord Chief Justice Wray read the sentence: "You must go to the place from whence you came, there to remain until ye shall be drawn through the open city of London upon hurdles to the place of execution, and there be hanged and let down alive, and your privy parts cut off, and your entrails taken out and burnt in your sight; then your heads to be cut off and your bodies divided into four parts, to be disposed of at Her Majesty’s pleasure. And God have mercy on your souls."

On hearing the death sentence, Campion and the other condemned men broke into the words of the Te Deum. After spending his last days in prayer he was dragged with two fellow priests, Ralph Sherwin and Alexander Briant, to Tyburn where the three were hanged, drawn and quartered on 1 December 1581. Campion was 41 years of age.

Veneration and feast day
Edmund Campion was beatified by Pope Leo XIII on 9 December 1886. Edmund Campion was canonised nearly eighty-four years later in 1970 by Pope Paul VI as one of the Forty Martyrs of England and Wales. His feast day is celebrated on 1 December, the day of his martyrdom. 

The actual ropes used in his execution are now kept in glass display tubes at Stonyhurst College in Lancashire; each year they are placed on the altar of St Peter's Church for Mass to celebrate Campion's feast day—which is always a holiday for the school.

Educational institutions named for Campion
Campion House, Osterley, London
Campion Hall, Oxford, England
Campion School, Hornchurch, England
 Campion Hall, Seattle,  Washington, United States 
Indo Scottish Global School, Kamothe, India
St Edmund Campion Catholic Primary School, Maidenhead, Berkshire, England
St Edmund Campion Catholic School, Erdington, Birmingham, England
St Edmund Campion RC Primary School, West Bridgford, Nottingham, England
St Edmund's Catholic Academy, Wolverhampton, England
Campion Jesuit High School, Prairie du Chien, Wisconsin, United States
St. Edmund Campion Academy, Cincinnati, Ohio, United States
Campion College, Regina, Canada
St. Edmund Campion Catholic School, Toronto, Ontario, Canada
St. Edmund Campion Secondary School, Brampton, Ontario, Canada
Campion College, Sydney, Australia
Campion College, Gisborne, New Zealand
Campion Anglo-Indian Higher Secondary School, Tiruchirappalli, Tamil Nadu, India
Campion School, Mumbai, India
Campion School, Bhopal, India
Campion School, Kochi, India
Campion School, Athens, Greece
Campion College, Kingston, Jamaica
Ocer Campion Jesuit College, Gulu, Uganda

See also
John Dolman (Jesuit)
Robert Persons

Notes

References

The most comprehensive and detailed scholarly reference today is Professor Gerard Kilroy's biography: Edmund Campion, A Scholarly Life London & New York: Routledge "Ashgate", 2015.

Sources
 
Campion, Edmund. A Historie of Ireland, written in the yeare 1571., Dublin, 1633. Facsimile ed., 1940, Scholars' Facsimiles & Reprints, .
De Backer, Bibliothèque de la Compagnie de Jesus, pp. 98–102. (A complete list of Edmund Campion's works) , etc.
 Foley, Henry, S.J., Records of the English Province of the Society of Jesus. Vol. III. London: Burns and Oates (1878).
Guiney, Louise Imogen, Blessed Edmund Campion, New York: Benziger Brothers (1908)
Simpson, Richard, Edmund Campion: a Biography, London: Williams and Norgate (1867)
Simpson, Richard, Edmund Campion, (1867). Revised, edited and enlarged by Fr Peter Joseph, Gracewing/Freedom Press (2010) 
Waugh, Evelyn, Edmund Campion, London: Williams and Norgate (1935). Sophia Institute Press (1996) 

Wood, Anthony, 1632–1695, Athenae Oxonienses, cols 473–478, London, 1813.

External links

 
  
 Campion's Brag or Challenge to the Privy Council at Eternal Word Television Network website.
 Campion's Ten Reasons Proposed to His Adversaries for Disputation in the Name of the Faith . . . , (the Decem Rationes) eBook at Project Gutenberg, in English and Latin, translated by Joseph Rickaby, commentary by J.H.P., (1910).
 

1540 births
1581 deaths
16th-century English Jesuits
People educated at Christ's Hospital
Fellows of St John's College, Oxford
Alumni of St John's College, Oxford
Anglican priest converts to Roman Catholicism
Catholic saints who converted from Protestantism
16th-century English Anglican priests
English College, Douai alumni
University of Douai alumni
Jesuit saints
Canonizations by Pope Paul VI
Forty Martyrs of England and Wales
Jesuit martyrs
People of the Elizabethan era
English Roman Catholic saints
People executed under the Tudors for treason against England
People executed under Elizabeth I by hanging, drawing and quartering
Executed writers
Executed people from London
Anglican clergy from London
Jesuits from London
16th-century Roman Catholic martyrs
People executed at Tyburn
16th-century Latin-language writers
Beatifications by Pope Leo XIII